Ellen Gomes de Oléria, known as Ellen Oléria (born 12 November 1982) is a Brazilian singer, musician, songwriter, and actress.

Life and career

Ellen was born in Brasília, Distrito Federal and was raised in Chaparral, a region of Taguatinga. Initially more interested in instruments, she began to sing in church choirs, by her parents influence. She started her musical career at sixteen. As an actress, she graduated in Performing Arts from the University of Brasília, in 2007.

Ellen mixes bossa nova, funk, hip hop, Música popular brasileira, samba, soul and poetry in letters and songs of her own. She opened for and participated in shows of Lenine, Paulinho Moska, Chico César, Ney Matogrosso, Margareth Menezes, Milton Nascimento, and Sandra de Sá (with whom she shared the stage in the celebrations of the 50th anniversary of Brasília).

She participated in the commemorative DVD of 25 career of GOG, "Cartão Postal Bomba!", and the album "Aviso às Gerações" in the song "Carta à Mãe África". She also participated in the CD "Tomo Um do Oráculo Universal das Constantes Inconstâncias Pessoais do Pessoal" from Radio Casual.

On 12 August 2013, she married Poliana Martins, in Brasília.

Pret.utu 
Since 2005 Ellen Oléria often presents with band Pret.utu, with the following members: Pedro Martins (guitarist and classical guitarist), Paula Zimbres (bass guitarist), Célio Maciel (drummer), Pedro Martins (guitarist), Felipe Viegas (keyboardist) e Léo Barbosa (percussionist).

Banda Soatá
Ellen Oléria participates as well in the Banda Soatá, a bond of alternative rock e carimbo founded in 2007, with members from Federal District and Pará from band Epadu. Besides Ellen, they have Jonas Santos (composer e guitarist), Riti Santiago (drummer), Dido Mariano (bassist) e Lieber Rodrigues (percussionist).

The Voice Brasil 
Ellen was the winner of the first season of the reality show The Voice Brasil of Rede Globo. She won a prize of 500,000 reais, a contract with Universal Music, career management, a car, and was one of the main attractions at the réveillon celebrations of Copacabana, Rio de Janeiro in 2012.

Performances on The Voice

Discography

Albums 
 2009 – Peça
 2011 – Ellen Oléria e Pret.utu – Ao Vivo no Garagem
 2013 – Ellen Oléria
 2016 – Afrofuturista

References

External links 

 Ellen Oléria at Dicionário Cravo Albin da Música Popular Brasileira 
 
 

1982 births
Living people
Brazilian stage actresses
Brazilian women composers
Brazilian women singer-songwriters
Feminist musicians
Lesbian singers
Lesbian songwriters
Brazilian lesbian musicians
Brazilian lesbian actresses
Brazilian LGBT singers
Brazilian LGBT songwriters
Brazilian LGBT rights activists
People from Brasília
Música Popular Brasileira singers
Brazilian funk singers
Hip hop singers
Samba musicians
Brazilian soul singers
The Voice (franchise) winners
21st-century Brazilian women singers
Women hip hop musicians
20th-century Brazilian LGBT people
21st-century Brazilian LGBT people
LGBT people in Latin music
Women in Latin music